Vice Admiral Sir John Gregory Crace  (6 February 1887 – 11 May 1968) was an Australian who came to prominence as an officer of the Royal Navy (RN). He commanded the Australian-United States Support Force, Task Force 44, at the Battle of the Coral Sea in 1942.

Early life
Crace was born to Kate Marion Crace and Edward Kendall Crace at Gungahlin, New South Wales (now part of the Australian Capital Territory). He was educated at The Kings School in Parramatta, before completing school in the UK in October 1899.

Naval career
Crace joined the Royal Navy as a cadet, aboard HMS Britannia, in May 1902. After being trained as  a torpedo officer, Crace served in the battlecruiser  through much of the First World War.

He travelled back and forth to Australia during the interwar years, and served in a series of sea and shore positions before being assigned command of the Australian Squadron in September 1939. Upon his arrival in Sydney, Crace grew increasingly dismayed at the state of the RAN fleet and attempted to resign. However, after war with Japan broke out, Crace was appointed commander of the Allied Naval Squadron, ANZAC Force.

During the Battle of the Coral Sea, Crace narrowly escaped a Japanese air raid while patrolling south of New Guinea. He returned to Britain in June 1942 as a vice admiral, commanding the Chatham Dockyard. Crace was placed on the retired list in 1945, but remained in command at Chatham until July 1946.

He was appointed Knight Commander of the Order of the British Empire in 1947. He had been appointed Companion of the Order of the Bath in 1941.

Sir John Crace died in Hampshire, England in 1968. The suburb of Crace, Australian Capital Territory is named after Crace's father, Edward Kendall Crace.

References

Footnotes

Bibliography
Coulthard-Clark, Chris, Action Stations Coral Sea, Sydney: Allen & Unwin, 1991.
Parrish, Thomas and S. L. A. Marshall, ed. The Simon and Schuster Encyclopedia of World War II, New York: Simon and Schuster, 1978.
Keegan, John, ed. The Rand McNally Encyclopedia of World War II. New York: Rand McNally & Company, 1977.

Further reading
Tucker, Spencer C., ed. Who's Who in Twentieth-Century Warfare. London: Routledge (UK), 2001.

External links
Who's Who in Australian Military History: Vice Admiral John Gregory Crace, KBE
Australian Dictionary of Biography: Crace, Sir John Gregory (Jack) (1887–1968)
Liddell Heart Centre for Military Archives
Royal Navy (RN) Officers 1939–1945: L.G.E. Crabbe to W.N. Custance

1887 births
1968 deaths
Australian Companions of the Order of the Bath
Australian Knights Commander of the Order of the British Empire
People educated at Stubbington House School
People educated at The King's School, Parramatta
Royal Australian Navy personnel of World War II
Royal Navy vice admirals
Royal Navy admirals of World War II
Royal Navy officers of World War I